Kočki Vrh is a small settlement in the Municipality of Sveti Jurij ob Ščavnici in northeastern Slovenia. The area is part of the traditional region of Styria and is now included in the Mura Statistical Region.

Geography
Kočki Vrh lies in the Slovene Hills east of Sveti Jurij ob Ščavnici. It is a scattered settlement on a ridge between the Ščavnica and Pesnica valleys. It is bordered by Peščeni Vrh to the west, by Kraljevci to the north and east, and by Župetinci and Andrenci to the south. There are fields and orchards along the ridge and on the upper part of the slopes.

History
Before the vineyards were destroyed by downy mildew caused by Plasmopara viticola in the 19th century, the farmers from the neighboring villages cultivated grapes in Kočki Vrh. In the late 20th century, many of the houses were still wooden with thatched roofs. The traditional rye thatching was replaced by lower-quality wheat thatching because of poor rye yields.

References

External links
Kočki Vrh at Geopedia

Populated places in the Municipality of Sveti Jurij ob Ščavnici